Camilo Mayr (born 4 March 1991 in Bogotá, Colombia) is a German archer. In 2012 participated in the men's individual competition at the 2012 Summer Olympics in London, finishing in joint 33rd place.

References

External links 
 
 
 

1991 births
Living people
Archers at the 2012 Summer Olympics
German male archers
Olympic archers of Germany
Sportspeople from Bogotá